Extreme Makeover: Home Edition (EM:HE; sometimes informally referred to as Extreme Home Makeover) is an American reality television series that aired from February 15, 2004 to January 13, 2012 on ABC. The series is a spin-off of Extreme Makeover that features a family that has faced some sort of recent or ongoing hardship having their home completely remodeled to better suit their exact needs.

The series was produced by Endemol USA in association with Disney-ABC Television Group's Greengrass Television. The original ABC run was hosted by Ty Pennington; the HGTV season was hosted by actor Jesse Tyler Ferguson. The executive producers were Brady Connell and George Verschoor.

Team

Reaction and criticism
Despite the show's positive message, EM:HE has been a target of tabloid media and scrutinized for several issues, including the show's ethics, its authenticity, and leaving some families with an increase in mortgage payments and property taxes due to higher assessments and worsening their circumstances.

Ethically speaking, the show has often been criticized by some viewers and the media for unnecessary contributions and glorifying excessive McMansion-like construction and lifestyles, such as in a Mother Jones article that questioned giving a 6-bedroom, 7-bath, 7-television house to a family of 4 in Kingston, Washington. However, ABC countered this criticism by explaining their approach towards building homes for each family was to do so in a manner which best suited their own individual needs, noting the sizes of many of the homes is due to the fact a considerable majority were built for either exceptionally large families, families of individuals with certain accessibility needs and families who ran various types of organizations or small businesses out of their homes, the latter of which was the case of the Kingston home. ABC responded to the Mother Jones article by noting they had failed to mention that particular home was also a functioning bed and breakfast.

Authentically speaking, one such claim was frequently made against the show's lead designers, particularly Ty Pennington. At several makeovers, they have been criticized for never doing any work at all, with anonymous contractors mostly doing the work and the designers only performing light work for the cameras. In 2007, during the makeover for the Carter Family in Billings, Montana, a local radio DJ accused Pennington of using a spray can of grease on his face to make it look like he was really working, only to be confronted over the air by Pennington himself, who called in from the construction site. The largest piece of evidence to prove the design team's contribution to the house and the family is a severe hand injury that Ed Sanders received during a 2006 makeover in Ohio for the family of Jason Thomas. While creating a wood carving of the American flag, Sanders removed part of the guard for a hand-held wood grinder, which led to him slicing one of his hands open. Sanders took a leave of absence for nearly an entire season to recover.

In an article entitled "ABC's 'Extreme Exploitation'", The Smoking Gun published an e-mail sent on March 10, 2006, from an ABC employee sent to the network's affiliate base, relaying a message from the program's casting agent detailing specific tragedies and rare illnesses sought by the show. Included were a "Muscular Dystrophy Child", a "Family who has multiple children w/ Down Syndrome (either adopted or biological)" and a child with a CIPA disorder. This last request included a parenthetical remark stating, "There are only 17 known cases in US - let me know if one is in your town!"
This e-mail has led some major media networks and blogs to accuse the show of opportunism in seeking out the most sensational stories in a push for higher ratings.

Another criticism aimed at the show surrounds financial issues that some of the families have had after receiving the home makeover, which following the onset of the Great Recession, received media attention. As of 2020, nine of the original show's recipient families have given up their homes due to financial issues, which included two foreclosures. While most cases were reported as resulting from instances such as unemployment, accumulations of medical bills or property tax rate increases, the most widely publicized cases featured families who had defaulted on home equity loans taken out on their homes since receiving them, one of which resulted in a foreclosure. In a 2018 interview with The Wrap, Pennington explained the nature of these cases. “There’s a couple of stories that families lost their home. We left them with a financial adviser. However, if the family chooses to triple-mortgage their house to start a business that they’ve never done before just to see if they can get into it, that’s their own demise. That’s how you lose your home, is you’re like, ‘Oh, let’s use it as a lottery ticket and see what we can get out of it. And then you lose it because you can’t make the payment. But that’s what press does. They were like, ‘This is too good to be true, what is really happening?’ But with ‘Extreme’ it really was that good.”

The five children of the Higgins family, aged 14–21, filed a lawsuit against ABC after they were evicted by a family that had taken them in before the show came to renovate the family's house. The five kids "say that the producers took advantage of the family's hard-luck story and promised them new cars and other prizes to persuade them to participate in the program", according to the LA Times. On July 17, 2007, Judge Paul Gutman ruled against the siblings, stating that the plaintiffs failed to prove their case. The decision of the trial court was affirmed on appeal.

Questions arose when Theresa "Momi" Akana was picked for a Hawaii-set episode. The Honolulu Advertiser investigated their tax records and found out that she and her husband each made over $100,000 in salary. Denise Cramsey, the executive producer of the show, responded with "I think Momi certainly fits the bill." She defended the pick by stating that they look beyond the family's finances and consider other factors, including family plight and contributions to the community.

Spin-off
Another spinoff, Extreme Makeover: Home Edition: How'd They Do That?, aired for one season between November 1, 2004 and May 23, 2005 and featured extra behind-the-scenes footage of what had happened in that week's episode.

Broadcast
On December 15, 2011, ABC announced that Extreme Makeover: Home Edition would end its run on January 13, 2012, but continue to air network specials. 

On January 15, 2019,  HGTV announced that they would be reviving the series; the revival premiered on February 16, 2020, running for 10 episodes until April 5, 2020.

Reruns of the series aired on Discovery Family from April 2020 to September 2022.

International versions
This list includes both officially licensed versions and so-called copies of this show, mostly inspired by that, but not licensed by Endemol Shine Group, the current owner of format.

See also 

 Mitre 10 Dream Home
 My Lottery Dream Home
 Prize home lottery
 Show home

References

External links

 
 Former website 
 
 

 
2004 American television series debuts
2012 American television series endings
2020 American television series debuts
2020 American television series endings
2000s American reality television series
2010s American reality television series
2020s American reality television series
American Broadcasting Company original programming
HGTV original programming
Makeover reality television series
Home renovation television series
Television series by Banijay
American television spin-offs
Reality television spin-offs
English-language television shows
Primetime Emmy Award for Outstanding Reality Program winners
Television shows set in the United States
Television series about families
Television series by Disney–ABC Domestic Television
American television series revived after cancellation
Television Academy Honors winners